Brianyoungite is a secondary zinc carbonate mineral. It is 
similar in appearance to hydrozincite, another zinc carbonate.  It was discovered in 1991 and designated IMA1991-053.  In 1993 it was named "brianyoungite" after Brian Young (born 1947), a field geologist with the British Geological Survey, who provided the first specimens.

Appearance 

The mineral occurs as tiny rosettes less than 100 µm across, composed of thin blades just one or two micrometers across, elongated parallel to the b crystal axis, and tapering to a sharp point.  The crystals are white and transparent to translucent, with a vitreous lustre and a white streak.

Structure 
The mineral belongs in the orthorhombic crystal system, or the monoclinic with β (the angle between the a and c crystal axes) close to 90o.  The space group is unknown, but assumed to be either P21/m, P21 or P2221.  The structure is similar to that of hydrozincite.  There are four formula units per unit cell (Z = 4) and the lengths of the sides of the unit cell are a = 15.724 Å, b = 6.256 Å and c = 5.427 Å.

Physical properties 
Brianyoungite is a soft mineral with Mohs hardness similar to halite, only 2 to  according to some sources, but others say that the hardness is not determinable. It   is fairly dense, with specific gravity 3.93 to 4.09, similar to that of celestine. Cleavage is perfect perpendicular to the a crystal axis (perfect on {100}) and possible perpendicular to the c crystal axis (possible on {001}).  It is readily soluble with effervescence in acids.

Optical properties 
The mineral is biaxial, with refractive indices nω = 1.635 and nε = 1.650 and maximum birefringence δ = 1.635. It exhibits straight extinction.  It is not fluorescent.

Occurrence 
The type locality is the Bloomsberry Horse level of the Brownley Hill mine, Nenthead, Alston Moor District, North Pennines, North and Western Region (Cumberland), Cumbria, England.  The type material is conserved at the Royal Museum of Scotland, Edinburgh, Scotland, 1992.17.1–8.
Brianyoungite occurs with gypsum on rubbly limestone in the oxidised zone of Brownley Hill Mine, and on specimens from the nearby Smallcleugh mine.  It may be a secondary post-mining mineral.
At the type locality it is associated with gypsum, smithsonite, pyrite and goethite.

References

Zinc minerals
Carbonate minerals
Monoclinic minerals
Minerals in space group 12
Minerals described in 1993